RingSide Fish House was a seafood restaurant in Portland, Oregon.

Description 

Mattie John Bamman of Eater Portland described RingSide Fish House as an "old-school" seafood restaurant, located in the Fox Tower next to southwest Portland's Director Park. The menu included oysters, Crab Louie, lobster, and cioppino.

History 
In 2011, the owner of RingSide Steakhouse confirmed plans to convert a temporary Fox Tower location into a seafood restaurant. The 240-seat restaurant opened on the building's second floor on July 18, 2011, with Johnny Nunn as the initial executive chef.

Jennie Peterson, the daughter of RingSide owner Craig Peterson, was the general manager, as of 2014, and David Ezelle was executive chef, as of April 2015. Jonathan Gill was the executive chef from 2016 to 2018.

In July 2018, Peterson and RingSide Hospitality Group announced plans to close the seafood restaurant on August 12, after operating for seven years.

Reception 
Eater Portland included RingSide Fish House in a 2015 overview of "Where to Get Your East Coast Lobster Fix in Portland". The website's Heather Arndt Anderson included the restaurant in a 2017 list of "Where to Eat and Drink Like a Pirate in Portland". She wrote, "If you want Salty's menu options and buttoned-up atmosphere without that pesky riverfront view, there's always Ringside. It's a nice spot for a fancy downtown dinner date."

See also

 List of seafood restaurants

References

External links 

 RingSide Fish House at Thrillist
 Ringside Fish House at Zomato

2011 establishments in Oregon
2018 disestablishments in Oregon
Defunct seafood restaurants in Portland, Oregon
Restaurants disestablished in 2018
Restaurants established in 2011
Southwest Portland, Oregon